Avliotes (Greek: Αυλιώτες) is a mountainous settlement lying at the northwest side of Corfu, Greece, 40 km from Corfu Town.  It is a community of the municipal unit of Esperies, with a population of 1276 according to the census of 2011.  It is set 120m above sea level, against a background of green hills.  The narrow main street can be a challenge for unwary or first time visitors but worth exploring - for those of a nervous disposition there is an almost complete "bypass" - this summer (2014) there was just a small section that remained un-tarmaced - which allows onward travel to Sidari and places west.

Population

See also

List of settlements in the Corfu regional unit

References

Populated places in Corfu (regional unit)